"I Maschi" (Italian "the males") is a song composed by Gianna Nannini and Fabio Pianigiani and performed by Gianna Nannini. 
The single peaked at second place  on the Italian hit parade. It was also an international hit, which charted in Austria, France, Germany, Belgium and Sweden. The song represented Italy at the 18th World Popular Song Festival in Tokyo. It was the title-track of the compilation album Maschi e Altri.
 
The song was  included in the soundtracks of several films, including the Maren Ade's drama Everyone Else and the Mika Kaurismäki's gangster-comedy Helsinki Napoli All Night Long.

Charts

Weekly charts

Year-end charts

Track listing
7" single – SRL 11066     
 "I Maschi" (Nannini - Pianigiani) -  	4:29
 "I Maschi (Mini-Maxi)" (Nannini - Pianigiani) -  	4:29

12" maxi single/CD Single – SRLM 2074/887 211-2  
 "I Maschi (Extra Long Version)" 	 -  11:45
 	"I Maschi (Long Version)" 	 - 6:05

12" maxi single Picture Disc – 887 375-1     
 "I Maschi (Extra Long Version)" 	 -  11:45
 	"I Maschi (Long Version)" 	 - 6:05
 	"America (Live Edit 1985 from TUTTO LIVE)" 	 - 5:05

References

 

1987 singles
Italian songs
1987 songs
Gianna Nannini songs